Johann Leonhard Pfaff (18 August 1775 in Hünfeld - 3 January 1848 in Fulda) was a bishop of the Roman Catholic Diocese of Fulda from 1832 to 1848. During his tenure he revised the statutes for the education of priests in Fulda.

Pfaff was ordained as priest on 19 September 1798. On 15 November 1831 he was appointed bishop of Fulda. He was confirmed on 24 February 1832, and ordained on 2 September 1832 by the bishop of Würzburg, Adam Friedrich Groß zu Trockau.

References

External links 
 Entry at catholic-hierarchy.org 

19th-century German Roman Catholic bishops
1775 births
1848 deaths
Roman Catholic bishops of Fulda